Italy competed at the 1991 World Championships in Athletics in Tokyo, Japan from 23 August to 1 September 1991.

Medalists

Finalists
Italy national athletics team ranked 6th (with 14 finalists) in the IAAF placing table. Rank obtained by assigning eight points in the first place and so on to the eight finalists.

Results
Italy participated with 48 athletes by winning a medal.

Men (33)

Women (15)

References

External links
3RD IAAF WORLD CHAMPIONSHIPS IN ATHLETICS

Nations at the 1991 World Championships in Athletics
World Championships in Athletics
Italy at the World Championships in Athletics